Round Top Station was the southernmost station of the Gettysburg and Harrisburg Railroad and was located west of a blacksmith shop along the Taneytown Road that was in operation in 1880.

History
Despite the 1882 survey of a rail route from the "H. J., H. and G. Railroad" to Round Top, Pennsylvania, for the Round-Top Railroad Company,  the competing G&H RR purchased property from Lewis A. Bushman in April 1884 for excursions (Little Round Top Park), and their Round Top Branch was instead being constructed in May 1884. The station warehouse was completed June 21, 1884 (burned February 22/23, 1889; rebuilt by August 1891); and to the rear of the warehouse in 1894 on a different railway from the west, the Gettysburg Electric Railway began trolley operations  The railroad-owned property along the north side of Wheatfield Rd extended eastward from the railway and had frontage along the Taneytown Rd at the corner, site of the 1895 Ollie Rouzer blacksmith shop. The north-south steamtrain railbed at Round Top became the east edge of the Gettysburg National Military Park (GNMP), which is adjacent to the private tracts along the Taneytown Road; and between 1904 and 1916 a siding was created at the station.  The station operated until  when the branch's abandonment application was filed.

References

G.   References at the Google News Archive:

Demolished railway stations in the United States
Railway stations in Pennsylvania
Railway stations in the United States opened in 1883
1883 establishments in Pennsylvania